James Okey Nash (1862–1943) was the Anglican  Coadjutor Bishop of Cape Town from 1917 until 1930.

Nash was educated at King William's College, Isle of Man; Hertford College, Oxford and Ripon College Cuddesdon.  He was  ordained in 1888. After a curacy at  St Andrews, Bethnal Green he was at Pusey House, Oxford from 1889 to 1892. He was one of original members of the Community of the Resurrection, Mirfield. He was Vicar of Radley from 1895 to 1898. He emigrated to South Africa in 1902 to be Chaplain to the Bishop of Pretoria; and after that was Headmaster of St. John's College, Johannesburg from 1906 to 1917.

He died on 7 April 1943.

Notes

1862 births
Holders of a Lambeth degree
20th-century Anglican Church of Southern Africa bishops
1943 deaths
People educated at King William's College
Alumni of Hertford College, Oxford
Alumni of Ripon College Cuddesdon
Anglican suffragan bishops in South Africa
British emigrants to South Africa
Anglican bishops of Cape Town